VoteForTheWorst.com (VFTW) was a website devoted to voting for the worst, most entertaining, most hated or quirkiest contestants on the Fox Network television series American Idol as well as the NBC Network television series The Voice. Smaller campaigns have also been started on the site for CTV's Canadian Idol, Fox's On the Lot and The Next Great American Band, NBC's America's Got Talent, and ABC's Dancing with the Stars. The website was started in 2004 during the third season of American Idol. Vote for the Worst also had a weekly radio show that has featured guests such as Ayla Brown, Trenyce, Leslie Hunt, Steffi DiDomenicantonio, Alex Wagner-Trugman and Todrick Hall. The site closed down in June 2013.

History

VFTW started at the Survivor Sucks message board and moved to a GeoCities website during season three of American Idol. The very first VFTW pick during Season 3 was Jennifer Hudson, dubbed "Boomquisha Santiago" or just "Boomie," during the semi-finals, but the site never picked her again as she improved in further weeks. When Hudson sang "Circle of Life" during finals, the camera went to a shot of Hudson's family members, with a cousin who sat with her arms folded while the others cheered. This cousin was dubbed "Whatevia," the namesake of VFTW's annual awards. The site began to upset regular Idol viewers with their support of John Stevens and Jasmine Trias, but it was largely unknown to the general public at this time.

During American Idol's fourth season, the site moved to its own domain name. VFTW gained its first bit of notoriety when Scott Savol outlasted Constantine Maroulis in the top 6 of Idol's fourth season and again appeared in the news when young crooner Kevin Covais made it to the top 11 in season five.

Season six of American Idol became a turning point for the website due to its support of candidates Antonella Barba and Sanjaya Malakar. Vote for the Worst was one of the first websites to break the story about Antonella Barba's racy online pictures. The site then made headlines by proving that the raciest pictures that appeared online (involving a Barba lookalike performing a sexual act) were not of Barba. After Barba and Sundance Head (another VFTW candidate) were voted out of the competition, Vote for the Worst selected Sanjaya Malakar as their pick. Malakar went on to last 6 more weeks in the competition, becoming a cultural phenomenon while gaining momentum along the way with support from celebrities such as Howard Stern. Entertainment Weekly called Malakar "the most popular Vote for the Worst candidate ever" and Malakar helped make Vote for the Worst a household name.

Season seven of American Idol saw the site stir up some major controversies. As the season began, Vote for the Worst posted a blog that season seven was being stacked with contestants with prior music industry experience and the controversy was picked up by news sources, including MTV, who decided to ask American Idol producer Ken Warwick about the issue. The site went a step further to also prove that Randy Jackson, a judge on American Idol, was the vice president of A&R at MCA Records while Carly Smithson, a season 7 contestant, recorded an album there. The second controversy started by the site was exposing contestant David Hernandez as a former gay stripper. Outside all of the controversies, Vote for the Worst supported Kristy Lee Cook and Brooke White when more popular Carly Smithson was eliminated.

During season eight of American Idol, Vote for the Worst's longest running contestant was Megan Joy, a quirky singer from Utah who made bird noises. The site also posted pictures of popular contestant Adam Lambert kissing another man, leading the general public to question Adam's sexuality due to the fact that he had not discussed this topic on the show. Bill O'Reilly ran Vote for the Worst's pictures of Adam during a news segment, but the show cropped the pictures to eliminate the actual kiss.

During season nine, Tim Urban broke the record for Vote for the Worst's longest-running American Idol pick ever, as well as tying for longest pick ever with Jaydee Bixby of Canadian Idol Season 3. He remained their pick for nine weeks: from the top 24 to the top seven. He was eliminated in 7th—the same week as Sanjaya Malakar in Season 6. Michael Lynche was originally selected for Top 5 week, but after the performances, the website switched to Casey James, marking the first time the website had changed its mind on which contestant to vote for based on performance alone. VFTW chose Lee DeWyze for the finale, and he won. This supported VFTW's theory that a female will never win the show again. According to bloggers at VFTW, the seasons have resulted in "3, white, male, brunette, soft-rockers" winners in a row.

Vote for the Worst was successful during seasons ten and eleven, supporting the 4th and 5th "white guys with a guitar," Scotty McCreery and Phillip Phillips, to win the title in five years.

In January 2013, the site's creator, Dave Della Terza, announced that the site would be shutting down, but not before covering one final season of American Idol. The shutdown was planned for June 2013, though it was not specified whether the site would simply be discontinuing all updates and left behind as an archive, or whether it would disappear entirely. As of April 2014, visiting the site results in a page indicating that the domain name has been "parked" with Go Daddy and is available for purchase.

Expansion to other shows

Because of the success of their American Idol campaign, Vote for the Worst has expanded its site to sometimes include other shows. The site helped support Casey Leblanc's 6 week run during Canadian Idol 3, Jaydee Bixby's unprecedented 9 week "worst" run from the final 10 to the final 2 during Canadian Idol 5, and Bristol Palin on Dancing with the Stars.

Vote for the Worst's mixed bag extends to other shows. The site had some success with a group like Light of Doom during The Next Great American Band, but was unable to help others such as Boy Shakira during America's Got Talent.

Reaction from American Idol
American Idol producers rarely acknowledge the site, but Nigel Lythgoe, an executive producer, did issue a statement, calling Vote for the Worst "a fly buzzing around a cow" during season six of American Idol to play down any press the site had received about being influential. In later seasons, Lythgoe has had a more playful repartee with the website, sending humorous tweets to the site's Twitter account.  Legal action has been threatened against the website from fans of American Idol, but to date neither Fox nor the series have issued statements regarding any lawsuits. Della Terza claims that lawyers involved with the program have contacted him twice about filing a lawsuit, but nothing has yet been filed against the site.

While many American Idol fans claim Vote for the Worst promotes hate speech and bullying on their message boards and online comments, some lesser known contestants from American Idol, have embraced the site. Josiah Leming, a contestant from season 7, is a member of the website and gave an interview to their weekly radio show. Chris Sligh, a season 6 contestant, gave a shoutout to site creator Della Terza during the top 11 performance show by saying "Hi, Dave." Sligh and fellow contestant Phil Stacey have also posted on the site's message board, along with many other former contestants such as Brenna Gethers, Chris Labelle, Phuong Pham, and Montana Martin Iles. Season 7 finalist Amanda Overmyer has also been vocal about her support of the website. Even season 9 runner-up Crystal Bowersox has posted on American Idols Facebook and Twitter that she loves VFTW.

VFTW-supported contestants

American IdolSeason 3Jennifer Hudson (Semifinals Week 1 Only)
Briana Ramirez-Rial (Semifinals Week 2)
Lisa Wilson (Semifinals Week 4)
Jon Peter Lewis (Wild Card Only)
Leah LaBelle (Top 12)
Matthew Rogers (Top 11)
John Stevens (Top 10 to Top 6)
Jasmine Trias (Top 5 to Top 3): Third PlaceSeason 4Janay Castine (Semifinals Weeks 1–3)
Constantine Maroulis (Semifinals Weeks 1–3 & Top 10 Only)
Mikalah Gordon (Top 12 to Top 11)
Scott Savol (Top 9 to Top 5)
Anthony Fedorov (Top 4)
Carrie Underwood (Top 3 to Finale): WinnerSeason 5Brenna Gethers (Semifinals Weeks 1–2)
Bobby Bennett (Semifinals Week 1)
David Radford (Semifinals Week 2)
Kevin Covais (Semifinals Week 3 to Top 11)
Kellie Pickler (Semifinals Week 3, Top 10 to Top 6)
Taylor Hicks (Top 5 to Finale): WinnerSeason 6Sundance Head (Semifinals Weeks 1–3)
Antonella Barba (Semifinals Weeks 1–3)
Sanjaya Malakar (Top 12 to Top 7)
Phil Stacey (Top 6)
LaKisha Jones (Top 4)
Blake Lewis (Top 3 to Finale): Runner-UpSeason 7Danny Noriega (Men's Semifinals Weeks 1–3)
Amy Davis (Women's Semifinals Week 1)
Amanda Overmyer (Semifinals Week 2 to Top 11)
Kristy Lee Cook (Top 10 to Top 7)
Brooke White (Top 6 to Top 5)
Jason Castro (Top 4)
David Archuleta (Top 3 to Finale): Runner-UpSeason 8Tatiana Del Toro (Semifinals Week 1, Wild-Card)
Nick Mitchell (Semifinals Week 2)
Alex Wagner-Trugman (Semifinals Week 3)
Megan Joy (Top 13 to Top 9)
Scott MacIntyre (Top 8)
Lil Rounds (Top 7 First & Second Week)
Matt Giraud (Top 5)
Danny Gokey (Top 4 to Top 3)
Kris Allen (Finale): WinnerSeason 9Haeley Vaughn (Women's Semifinals Weeks 1–2)
Paige Miles (Women's Semifinals Week 3)
Tim Urban (Men's Semifinals Week 1 – Top 7; tied for longest running VFTW pick with Jaydee Bixby; longest running ever American Idol pick)
Siobhan Magnus (Top 6)
Casey James (Top 5 – Top 3; Michael Lynche was originally picked, was switched to Casey after the performance night.)
Lee DeWyze (Finale): WinnerSeason 10Brett Loewenstern (Men's Semifinals)
Rachel Zevita (Women's Semifinals)
Paul McDonald (Top 13 to Top 8)
Casey Abrams (Top 7 to Top 6)
Jacob Lusk (Top 5)
Haley Reinhart (Top 4 to Top 3)
Scotty McCreery (Finale): WinnerSeason 11Eben Franckewitz (Men's Semifinals)
Haley Johnsen (Women's Semifinals)
Shannon Magrane (Top 13 to Top 11)
Heejun Han (Top 10 to Top 9)
Deandre Brackensick (Top 8)
Phillip Phillips (Top 7 to Finale): WinnerSeason 12Zoanette Johnson (Women's Semifinals)
Charlie Askew (Men's Semifinals)
Lazaro Arbos (Top 10 to Top 6)
Janelle Arthur (Top 5)
Kree Harrison (Top 4 to Finale): Runner-Up

Canadian IdolSeason 3 Cher Maendel
 Dave Moffatt
 Keely Hutton
 Jenn Beaupre
 Casey LeBlanc
 Suzi Rawn
 Rex Goudie: Season 3 Runner-UpSeason 4 Chris Labelle
 Nancy Silverman
 Brandon Jones
 Chad Doucette
 Tyler Lewis
 Craig Sharpe: Season 4 Runner-UpSeason 5 Tyler Mullendore
 Maud Coussa-Jandl
 Naomi-Joy Blackhall
 Annika Odegard
 Jaydee Bixby: Season 5 Runner-Up (tied for longest running pick)Season 6 Mark Day
 Mitch MacDonald: Season 6 Runner-Up

On the LotSeason 1 Kenny Luby

America's Got TalentSeason 2 Boy ShakiraSeason 5 Airpocalypse (Quarterfinals Week 1)
 Ronith (Quarterfinals Week 2)
 Mary Ellen (Quarterfinals Week 4)
 PUP (Quarterfinals Week 5 "Youtube" Special)
 Doogie Horner (Quarterfinals Week 6 "Wildcard" Special)
 Prince Poppycock (Semi-finals Week 1 – Top 4)Season 6 Those Funny Little People (Quarterfinals Week 1)
Thomas John (Quarterfinals Week 2)Season 7Lil' Starr (Quarterfinals Week 1)

The Next Great American BandSeason 1 Light of Doom

Clash of the ChoirsSeason 1 Team Lachey – Winners

America's Best Dance CrewSeason 2 Fanny PakSeason 3 Dynamic EditionSeason 6 ICONic Boyz

Dancing With The StarsSeason 5Marie Osmond and Jonathan RobertsSeason 7 Cloris Leachman and Corky BallasSeason 11 Margaret Cho and Louis van Amstel
 Bristol Palin and Mark Ballas

I'm a Celebrity... Get Me Out of Here!Season 2 Heidi Montag and Spencer Pratt (quit before VFTW could cast any votes for them)
 Janice Dickinson

X Factor (UK)Series 6 John and EdwardSeries 7 WagnerSeries 8 Johnny Robinson
 Frankie Cocozza (Cocozza was chosen following Robinson's elimination, but was removed from the show before the next public vote.)

X Factor (US)Season 1Astro (Top 12 to Top 7)
 Chris Rene (Top 5 to Finale): Third PlaceSeason 2Tate Stevens (Top 4 to Finale): Winner

The VoiceSeason 1 Raquel Castro (Team Christina)
 Xenia (Team Blake)
 Devin Barley (Team Adam)
 Curtis Grimes (Team Cee-Lo)Season 2'
 RaeLynn (Team Blake)
 Erin Martin (Team Cee-Lo)
 Mathai (Team Adam)
 Tony Lucca (Team Adam)

See also
 List of satirical magazines
 List of satirical news websites
 List of satirical television news programs

References

External links
 
 

Entertainment Internet forums
Internet properties established in 2004
Internet properties disestablished in 2013
Idols (franchise)
American satirical websites
2004 establishments in the United States
2013 disestablishments in the United States